The 1951–52 season was the 37th in the history of the Isthmian League, an English football competition.

Leytonstone were champions for the third season in a row, winning their eighth Isthmian League title. At the end of the season Tufnell Park Edmonton resigned from the league and switched to the Spartan League.

League table

References

Isthmian League seasons
I